Mockbeggar is a hamlet in the New Forest National Park of Hampshire, England. Its nearest town is Ringwood, which lies approximately 3 miles (5.6 km) south-west from the hamlet. It is in the civil parish of Ellingham, Harbridge and Ibsley.

Villages in Hampshire